Citizens National Bank was founded on July 11, 1890, at 4th and Main Streets in Laurel, Maryland as Citizens National Bank of Laurel. The bank's founder and first president was Charles H. Stanley. Barnes Compton is also identified as a founder and early director of the bank. On April 1, 1965, it was renamed to Citizens National Bank after merging with The Central Bank of Howard County.

On January 3, 1977, Citizens National Bank acquired Belair National Bank.

On September 15, 2007, Citizens National was acquired by PNC Bank, National Association and was renamed as its "Laurel Main Street Branch".

References

Banks based in Maryland
Banks established in 1890
Defunct financial services companies of the United States
1890 establishments in Maryland
Defunct banks of the United States
Banks disestablished in 2007
2007 disestablishments in Maryland